Arizona Days is a 1937 American Western film directed by John English and starring Tex Ritter, Eleanor Stewart, Syd Saylor. It is the third Western singing cowboy Ritter made for producer Edward Finney for Grand National Pictures. Many public domain prints are missing sequences from the original release.

Plot
Tex and his sidekick "Grass" Hopper are delighted to join a travelling music show. When a group of cowboys come in without paying, Tex steps down from the stage, pulls his six gun and holds the audience up until the manager points out the men who did not pay their admission fee. After seeing the way Tex gathers revenue from cheats, the County commissioner offers Tex a job as a tax collector.

Cast
Tex Ritter	... Tex Malinson 
Syd Saylor  ... Claude "Grass" Hopper 
William Faversham ... Professor McGill 
Eleanor Stewart ... Marge Workman 
Forrest Taylor ... Harry Price 
Snub Pollard  ... Cookie 
Tommy Bupp 	... Billy Workman
Glenn Strange ... Henchman Pete 
Budd Buster	... Sheriff Ed Higginbotham 
Salty Holmes... Harmonica Player

Soundtrack
High, Wide and Handsome
Written by Tex Ritter and Ted Choate
Sung by Tex Ritter

Tombstone, Arizona
Written by Tex Ritter and Jack C. Smith
Sung by Tex Ritter

Arizona Days 
Written by Tex Ritter and Jack C. Smith
Sung by Tex Ritter

If Love Were Mine 
Written by Frank Sanucci
Sung by Tex Ritter

External links 
 
  Arizona Days available for free download at Internet Archive

1937 films
American black-and-white films
1937 Western (genre) films
Grand National Films films
American Western (genre) films
Films directed by John English
1930s English-language films
1930s American films